The Bromme culture is a late Upper Paleolithic culture dated to c. 11,600 to 9,800 cal BC, which corresponds to the second half of the Allerød Oscillation. 

At this time, reindeer was the most important prey, but the Bromme people also hunted moose/elk, wolverine and beaver. The landscape was a combination of taiga and tundra.

The culture is named after a settlement at Bromme on western Zealand, and it is known from several settlements in Denmark and Schleswig-Holstein. In Sweden, it is known from the country's earliest known settlement at Segebro, near Malmö.

It is characterized by sturdy lithic flakes that were used for all tools, primarily awls, scrapers, stone axes and tanged points

The Bromme culture and the Ahrensburg culture are so similar that it has been proposed that they should be classed as one and the same, under the label Lyngby culture, with the Bromme culture being recognized as an older northern branch of the same culture as the Ahrensburg culture.

References
Nationalencyklopedin

Archaeological cultures of Central Europe
Archaeological cultures of Northern Europe
Paleolithic cultures of Europe
Archaeological cultures in Denmark
Archaeological cultures in Germany
Archaeological cultures in Lithuania
Archaeological cultures in Poland
Scandinavian archaeology
Nordic Stone Age